B29 may refer to:
 B-29 Superfortress, an aircraft
 A human gene also known as CD79B
 Sicilian Defence, Encyclopaedia of Chess Openings code